Elizabeth Pérez ( June 16, 1976) is a Cuban-Venezuelan-American television journalist and presenter working for CNN en Español in Miami, Florida.

Early life
Elizabeth Pérez moved from Cuba to Venezuela with her parents at an early age. She was born in Sagua La Grande, Las Villas, Cuba but grew up in Maracay, Aragua State.  She attended the Universidad Bicentenaria de Aragua and graduated as a Systems Engineer. In 2000 Pérez studied English at Boston University in Massachusetts. In 2002 she was awarded a scholarship granted by the Puerto Rican Newspaper “El Nuevo Día” and enrolled at Florida International University. While at FIU, Pérez interned with El Nuevo Herald where she wrote and published several articles on different topics. Pérez also interned with Telemundo where she produced and anchored an entertainment segment for Telemundo Internacional. Before graduating from FIU, Pérez was hired by Telemundo as an entertainment anchor for several shows of the station. She holds a master's degree in Mass Communications from Florida International University.

Career
Pérez is currently a Sports anchor and correspondent for CNN en Español covering the latest and most relevant news in the world of sports throughout the daytime programming.

Pérez joined CNN after working as a TV presenter for the sports segments on Telemundo News, based in Miami, where she was also invited as a guest reporter on the extreme sport show, Ritmo Deportivo.

She started her television career as an Entertainment Reporter for the Telemundo Internacional Weekend Newscast broadcast in Latinoamerica and parts of Europe.

In 2004, Pérez became the Co-Host and Entertainment Anchor for “Quiéreme Descalzi”, a news magazine in América Teve.

In 2006 Pérez hosted Galavision 2 hour special "Rumbo a Premios Juventud".

Pérez has hosted other shows on Telemundo including Reventon Billboards 2009 and Calle 8. In 2008 and 2009 she reported live from the Red Carpet of Premios Billboard a la Música Latina for Telemundo 51 Newscast.

Pérez has covered significant sporting events such as NASCAR in Indianapolis, Indy300 in the Homestead Speedway, the Red Bull SoapBox race in St. Louis, The Air and Boat show in Fort Lauderdale, and the Smash Super Bowl party for the NFL. She has also interviewed relevant figures in the world of sports, music and arts such as Oscar de la Renta, Udonis Haslem, Shaquille O’Neal, Carl Lewis, Dwayne “The Rock” Johnson, Emerson Fittipaldi, Miguel Cabrera, Ramon Dominguez, Shakira, David Bisbal, Daddy Yankee, Chayanne, Juanes, América Ferrera, and Enrique Iglesias, among others.

In 2011, Cynthia Hudson, senior vice president and general manager of CNN en Español and Hispanic strategy for CNN/U.S. welcomed Pérez saying: “Our viewers are assiduous sports fans, and we are pleased to bring, throughout the day, everything they want to know about this fascinating world with the hiring of a dynamic journalist such as Elizabeth.”

In 2011 Pérez anchored special shows for CNN en Español related to Sports: Herencia Hispana, Playoffs and Trás el Oro. That same year, she covered the Copa Libertadores and Copa América for CNN en Español and CNNI. Pérez reported live from Atlanta a weekly segment called Copa Chat for World Sports, the CNNI show broadcast from London and anchored by Don Riddell. She also served as a correspondent covering the 2011 Pan American Games in Guadalajara, Mexico.

Awards
In 2008, Pérez received the highest award given by the National Academy of Arts and Science Television (NATAS) in the United States, the Emmy Award for Best on Camera News Talent, for her work at Telemundo News. In 2009 she was nominated in the same category.

Charity work
She has been an active volunteer with Big Brothers Big Sisters of America since 2007.

References

External links
 https://www.facebook.com/eliperezcnn
 https://twitter.com/EliperezCNN
 http://cnnespanol.cnn.com/category/presentadores/elizabeth-perez/
 http://cnnobservations.blogspot.com/2011/04/cnn-en-espanol-adds-elizabeth-perez-to.html

Living people
Cuban emigrants to Venezuela
People from Sagua la Grande
Venezuelan emigrants to the United States
Venezuelan television personalities
Sports commentators
Florida International University alumni
CNN people
Venezuelan women journalists
1976 births